This is a list of notable alumni of Kappa Alpha Order.

Media 
 Michael Beck (Alpha Mu) – actor
 Pat Boone (Gamma Lambda) – actor and recording artist
 Marty Brennaman (Zeta) – announcer for the Cincinnati Reds
 Zac Brown (Zeta Kappa) – lead vocalist with the multiple Grammy-winning country group the Zac Brown Band
 Michael Brun (Sigma) – DJ and producer
 Thomas Dixon, Jr. (Tau) – author, playwright
 Bill Engvall (Xi) – actor and comedian
 Ben Ferguson (Alpha Upsilon) – conservative radio talk show host, author
 Ryan Fournier (Zeta Psi) - American political commentator
 Tyler Gerth (Theta) - Photography/Racial Justice Advocate
 George Grizzard (Upsilon) – actor, won Tony Award in 1996
 Taylor Hackford (Beta Sigma) – film director, won Oscar in 1979
 George Hamilton IV (Upsilon) – country music singer
 Rob Huebel (Delta Omicron) – comedian and actor
 Adam Johnson (Epsilon Omega) – writer, 2013 fiction Pulitzer Prize
 William Joyce (Beta Lambda) – author, artist, illustrator with Disney/Pixar and others
 Bill Lawrence (Alpha Zeta) – television writer, producer, and director
 Delbert Mann (Chi) – film director, won an Oscar and Palme d'Or in 1955
 Frank McCarthy (Beta) – movie producer, won an Oscar in 1970
 Page McConnell (Beta Lambda) – member of music groups Phish and Vida Blue
 Richard Moll (Alpha Xi) – actor, played "Bull Shannon" on Night Court
 Rich O'Toole (Epsilon Delta) – country music singer
 Anthony Perkins (Alpha Psi) – prolific actor, played Norman Bates in Psycho
 Mark Povinelli (Epsilon Lambda) – actor
 Charlie Rose (Alpha Phi) – talk show host
 Randolph Scott (Alpha Sigma) – actor
 Ned Vaughn (Phi) – actor
 Mark L. Walberg (Delta Tau) – television host
 Douglass Wallop (Beta Kappa) – writer, won Tony Award in 1956

Business 
 Alex Murdaugh - (Rho) - Former attorney, convicted of capital murder in March, 2023. 
 Christopher Chmelik (Alpha Kappa) - CEO of Big Dogg Enterprises
 Robert Crandall (Alpha Zeta) – former president, chairman and CEO of American Airlines
 Ken May (Gamma Gamma) – CEO of FedEx and Kinko's
 Jerry Richardson (Delta) – Carolina Panthers owner and founder
 George W. Woodruff (Alpha Sigma) – director of the Coca-Cola Company, 1936–1985
 Robert W. Woodruff (Epsilon) – president of the Coca-Cola Company, 1926–1954
 Jeffery Hildebrand (Omicron) – founder, chairman, and CEO Hilcorp Energy Company
 John Fishwick (Beta Rho) – American railroad executive and chief executive of Norfolk and Western Railway
 Ely Callaway Jr. (Epsilon) – American entrepreneur, textiles executive, winemaker and vintner and golf club manufacturer, as the founder of Callaway Golf
 Thomas J. Konetski III (Alpha Rho) - founder, CEO, and chief artistic contributor of Black H@LE Teknologies

Education 
 William James Barrow (Zeta) – chemist and paper conservator
 Andrew Nelson Lytle (Chi) – novelist, dramatist, essayist, professor of literature at the University of Florida and the University of the South
 John B. Watson (Iota) – psychologist, founder of behaviorism
Sam S. Walker (Beta Commission) – U.S. Army general, superintendent of Virginia Military Institute.

Government 
 Thurman Adams (Beta Epsilon) – former senator and President Pro Tempore of state senate (Delaware)
 Robert Aderholt (Phi) – US Congressman from Alabama
 Carl Albert (Beta Eta) – former US Representative for Oklahoma; Speaker of the House, 1971–1977
 Paul Atkins (Delta) – former commissioner of the US Securities and Exchange Commission
 Roger Bedford, Jr. (Alpha Beta) – state senator, Alabama
 Roy Blunt (Alpha Eta) – US Congressman and senator from Missouri
 J. Caleb Boggs (Beta Epsilon) – former governor and US Senator from Delaware
 Rick Boucher (Beta Rho) – US Congressman from Virginia
 Charles Boustany (Gamma Phi) – US Congressman from Louisiana
 William Denis Brown, III – former state senator from Monroe, Louisiana
 Bryan Edward Bush, Jr. – former district attorney of East Baton Rouge Parish, Louisiana
 Adm. Richard E. Byrd (Beta) – US Navy, Antarctic explorer; Medal of Honor recipient
 William Clements (Beta Lambda) – former governor of Texas
 Clark M. Clifford (Beta Theta) – former counsel to US presidents Truman, Eisenhower and Kennedy; former secretary of defense
 Larry Combest (Gamma Chi) – US Congressman from Texas
 Zel M. Fischer (Alpha Delta) – judge, Missouri Supreme Court
 Don Fowler (Delta) – former chairman of the Democratic National Committee.
 Bart Gordon (Delta Lambda) – US Congressman from Tennessee
 Henry Hager (Tau) – husband of Jenna Bush, daughter of US President George W. Bush
 William Pike Hall, Sr. (Alpha Iota) – member of the Louisiana State Senate from Shreveport, 1924–1932
 Robert W. Hemphill (Rho) – former US Congressman from South Carolina, 1957–1964; Federal Judge for South Carolina, 1965–1980
 George Hooks (Nu) – senator of Georgia
 J. Edgar Hoover (Alpha Nu) – former director of the Federal Bureau of Investigation
 Richard Hudson (Epsilon Xi) – US Congressman from North Carolina
 Edgar Erskine Hume (Omega) - American physician, highly-decorated Major General in the U.S Army medical corps, Founder Delta Omega
 Whitfield Jack (Alpha Iota) – United States Army officer in World War II; major general of United States Army Reserve, attorney in Shreveport (Louisiana)
 Mike Johnson (Alpha Gamma) – member of the Louisiana House of Representatives for Bossier Parish
 Joe Kennedy III (Alpha Pi) - Member of the U.S. House of Representatives from Massachusetts's 4th district
 Bill Lee – Governor of Tennessee
 Buddy MacKay (Beta Zeta) – former governor, lieutenant governor, and US Representative from Florida
 James MacKay (Epsilon) – senator
 GA George C. Marshall (Beta) – former US Secretary of State; former US Secretary of Defense; former US Army Chief of Staff' namesake of the Marshall Plan; Nobel Peace Prize recipient; graduate of the Virginia Military Institute
 Henry McMaster (Rho) – Governor of South Carolina
 Johnathan Marchant (Alpha Beta) – Republican Political Consultant 
 Daniel Mongiardo (Alpha Theta) – Lt. Governor of Kentucky, 2007–2011
 G.V. "Sonny" Montgomery (Beta Tau) – former US Congressman, author of the GI Bill of Rights
 Bill Owens (Delta Kappa) – former governor of Colorado
 Gen. George S. Patton (Beta) – former commander, 3rd US. Army
 Austin Peay (Omega) – former governor of Tennessee
 Gen. J. H. Binford Peay III (Beta) – former commander, 101st Airborne Division, US CENTCOM; Superintendent of VMI
 Claude Pepper (Alpha Omega) – former US Congressman from Florida; former US Senator from Florida
 Melvin Purvis (Rho) – FBI; headed the Division of Investigation Offices in Birmingham, Alabama; led successful manhunts for Pretty Boy Floyd, Baby Face Nelson, and John Dillinger
 Dean Rusk (Sigma) – former US Secretary of State
 Gen Lemuel C. Shepherd, Jr. (Beta) – former Commandant of the United States Marine Corps
 Ellison D. Smith (Delta/Rho) – US Senator, South Carolina
 Floyd Spence (Rho) – US Congressman from South Carolina
 Dennis Stine (Delta Xi) – former member of the Louisiana House of Representatives and commissioner of administration for then Governor Buddy Roemer
 Earl Ray Tomblin (Alpha Rho) – Governor of West Virginia
 Richard Truly (Alpha Sigma) – vice admiral, US Navy; astronaut; former director of NASA
 GEN Sam S. Walker (Beta Commission) – army officer, superintendent of VMI.
 Dayton Waller (Alpha Iota) – member of the Louisiana House of Representatives, 1968–1972
 Steve Womack (Epsilon Zeta) – US Congressman from Arkansas
 Ken Mika (Epsilon Phi) – Award-winning Political Fundraising Consultant, CEO of Politicoin
 MG Cedric T. Wins (Beta Commission) - U.S. Army Officer, Superintendent of VMI.

Religion 
 Rt. Rev. James L. Duncan (Kappa) – former bishop, Episcopal Diocese of Southeast Florida
 Rt. Rev. Henry Judah Mikell (Alpha Alpha) – former bishop, Episcopal Diocese of Atlanta
 Bishop Robert C. Morgan (Phi) – retired bishop; Mississippi and Kentucky Annual Conferences; former president of the United Methodist Council of Bishops
 Rt. Rev. William J. Skilton (Theta Commission) – former suffragan bishop Episcopal Diocese of South Carolina, former assistant bishop Episcopal Diocese of the Dominican Republic
 Rt. Rev William Angie Smith (Xi) - former Methodist bishop of the Oklahoma-New Mexico episcopal area.

Sports 
 Tommy Aaron (Beta Zeta) – professional golfer; 1973 Masters Champion
 Tony Azevedo (Alpha Pi) – water polo player; four-time All-American; three-time National Player of the Year; three-time Olympian
 Bill Bergey (Delta Eta) – four-time All-Pro player; member of the Philadelphia Eagles Honor Roll
 David Binn (Alpha Xi) – San Diego Chargers, long snapper, 1994–2011
 Rex Cawley (Beta Sigma) – Olympic gold medalist (1964) and former world record holder, 400m hurdles
 Jarron Collins (Alpha Pi) – NBA player, Phoenix Suns
 Jason Collins (Alpha Pi) – NBA player, Atlanta Hawks
 Ben Crenshaw (Omicron) – professional golfer and Master's champion in 1984 and 1995
 Al Geiberger (Beta Sigma) – professional golfer
 Burt Hooton (Omicron) – former Major League Baseball player and coach
 Don January (Gamma Lambda) – professional golfer
 Paul Johnson (Delta Alpha) – head football coach for Georgia Tech
 Christian "Sonny" Jurgensen III (Alpha Phi) – former professional football player, Pro Football Hall of Fame inductee
 Joe Kapp (Alpha Xi) – former professional football player, College Football Hall of Fame inductee
 Clyde Littlefield (Omicron) – former University of Texas football and track & field coach
 Jack Maguire (Gamma Eta) – professional golfer
 Tim McCarver (Gamma Gamma) – former professional baseball player
 Hal Mumme (Delta Rho) – head football coach, New Mexico State University
 Will Muschamp (Gamma) – co-Defensive Coordinator, University of Georgia
 Ernest Nevers (Alpha Pi) – former professional baseball and football player, Pro Football Hall of Fame inductee
 Tommy Nobis (Omicron) – former professional football player with Atlanta Falcons; University of Texas All-American; 1965 winner of the Outland Trophy & Maxwell Award
 Charles Paddock (Beta Sigma) – three-time Olympic gold medalist, track & field
 Jerry Richardson (Delta) – Wofford College receiver – Associated Press Little All-America selection in 1957 & 1958; former professional football player with Baltimore Colts; former owner of the NFL Carolina Panthers
 Jay Sigel (Tau) – professional golfer
 Brandt Snedeker (Chi) – professional golfer
 Melvin Stewart (Pi) – Olympic gold medalist, swimming
 Dave Stockton (Beta Sigma) – professional golfer
 Danny Sullivan (Theta) – Formula One and Indycar driver, 1985 Indianapolis 500 Winner
 William Vlachos (Alpha Beta) – All-American Center and two time (2009, 2011) National Champion for the Alabama Crimson Tide
 Sam Wyche (Iota) – former NFL head coach; NFL analyst
 Frank Wykoff (Beta Sigma) – Olympic gold medalist, 1928, 1932, 1936, in track & field
 Ernie Zampese (Beta Sigma) – NFL offensive coordinator who helped pioneer the west coast offense

References

Kappa Alpha
members